Moby Dick House of Kabob (Persian: موبی دیک: خانه کباب) is a Persian kabob restaurant chain in the Washington metropolitan area. It is named after a restaurant in Tehran which was right near the American Embassy during the Pahlavi's time; that restaurant was permanently closed after the Iranian revolution in 1979. The first Moby Dick restaurant opened in Bethesda, Maryland in 1989.

History

Founder Mike Daryoush emigrated to the United States from Iran in 1975. He opened a small sandwich shop in 1987 in Bethesda, Maryland, serving a few Middle Eastern dishes. He changed to a Persian menu and added a clay oven in 1989. The name references one of the biggest kabob joints in Tehran, which was right near the American Embassy during the Shah's time. It was called Moby Dick, apparently because the owner really liked the book. The newest location opened in Baltimore in 2017. Daryoush died of heart failure on May 9, 2019, only a week after the chain's 30th anniversary.

References

External links
Moby Dick's House of Kabob
Moby Dick House of Kabob - Georgetown in the Washington Post CityGuide

Middle Eastern-American culture in Washington, D.C.
Iranian-American culture
Iranian-American culture in Washington, D.C.
Iranian cuisine
Middle Eastern-American culture in Maryland
Privately held companies based in Washington, D.C.
Restaurants established in 1989
Restaurants in Maryland
Restaurants in Washington, D.C.
American companies established in 1989
1989 establishments in Maryland